Austria is scheduled to compete at the 2019 European Games, in Minsk, Belarus from 21 to 30 June 2019. Austria had previously competed at the 2015 European Games in Baku, Azerbaijan, where it won 13 medals, including 3 golds.

Medalists

|width="30%" align=left valign=top|

Archery

Recurve

Badminton

Boxing

Men

Canoe sprint

Women

Cycling

Road
Men

Women

Track
Endurance

Omnium

Gymnastics

Artistic
Women

Rhythmic
Individual

Judo

Men

Women

Mixed team

Karate

Men

Women

Shooting

Men

Women

Mixed team

Table tennis

References

Nations at the 2019 European Games
European Games
2015